Betty Boop is an ongoing teen comic book series by Dynamite Entertainment featuring the eponymous character originally created by Max Fleischer. It is licensed by Fleischer Studios and debuted in October 2016.

References

Betty Boop
2016 comics debuts